Ajdi Dajko (born 28 October 2002) is an Albanian professional footballer who plays as a centre-back for Greek Super League 2 club AEK Athens B.

References

2002 births
Living people
Albanian footballers
Albania youth international footballers
Super League Greece 2 players
AEK Athens F.C. players
Albanian expatriate footballers
Expatriate footballers in Greece
Association football defenders
AEK Athens F.C. B players